Gilbert Mercier (born 2 May 1931) is a French former biathlete. He competed in the 20 km individual event at the 1960 Winter Olympics.

References

External links
 

1931 births
Possibly living people
French male biathletes
Olympic biathletes of France
Biathletes at the 1960 Winter Olympics
Sportspeople from Savoie